Gyselle de la Caridad Silva Franco (born 29 October 1991) is a Cuban volleyball player. She is currently playing for Greek club AEK Athens in the A1 Ethniki. She was part of the Cuba women's national volleyball team.

She participated at the 2010 FIVB Volleyball Women's World Championship in Japan. 
She played with Santiago de Cuba.

Dubbed as "Volleyball Goddess" and "Queen of Gravity" by Filipino fans.

She tallied the fourth-best scoring record in the whole world in a single match. She scored 56 points highlighted by 53 attacks and 3 aces on a lost cause after succumbing against the Cocolife Asset Managers last April 7, 2018, in a five-set conquest in a match in the inaugural Philippine Super Liga (PSL).

Clubs
  Santiago de Cuba (2009–2012) 
  Rabita Baku (2014–2015) 
  Halkbank Ankara (2015–2016) 
  Yunnan University Dianchi College (2016–2017)
  Smart Prepaid Giga Hitters (2017–2018)
  Reale Mutua Fenera Chieri (2018–2019)
  Grupa Azoty Chemik Police (2019–2020)
  IŁ Capital Legionovia Legionowo (2021–2022)
  AEK Athens (2022–)

References

External links
 CEV Profile
 Volleybox.net Profile

1991 births
Living people
Cuban women's volleyball players
Place of birth missing (living people)
Volleyball players at the 2011 Pan American Games
Pan American Games silver medalists for Cuba
Pan American Games medalists in volleyball
Middle blockers
Opposite hitters
Expatriate volleyball players in the Philippines
Expatriate volleyball players in Azerbaijan
Expatriate volleyball players in Turkey
Cuban expatriate sportspeople in Turkey
Cuban expatriates in the Philippines
Halkbank volleyball players
Medalists at the 2011 Pan American Games